Kiss Radio may refer to:

Kiss (UK radio station) in the United Kingdom
Kiss Radio Taiwan
CKKS-FM, a radio station in Chilliwack/Abbotsford/Vancouver, British Columbia, Canada

See also
Kiss the Radio, a South Korean radio program